Five Brides is a 2011 Russian comedy film directed by Karen Oganesyan.

Plot 
The film takes place in Berlin after the Great Patriotic War. Young pilots miss women a lot. Their friend Alexey goes on a business trip to the USSR. Learning about this, they give him their military tickets, each of which they ask him to put a stamp on marriage and bring wives to them. Alexey has only one day to do this.

Cast 
 Elizaveta Boyarskaya as Zoya
 Aleksey Dmitriev as Egor
 Andrey Fedortsov
 Marina Golub as Galina
 Michael Gor as Kuzichev (as Mikhail Gorevoy)
 Danila Kozlovsky as Aleksey Kaverin
 Khoren Levonyan as Garik Margaryan
 Aleksandr Loye as Ivan Mazaev
 Svetlana Nikiforova
 Irina Pegova as Lilya
 Yuliya Peresild

References

External links 
 

2011 films
2010s Russian-language films
Russian romantic comedy films
2011 comedy films